Events from the year 1946 in art.

Events
 March – Art collector Peggy Guggenheim publishes the first edition of her autobiographical Out of This Century in the United States.
 April 2 – Jackson Pollock's third solo exhibition opens in the Daylight Gallery of Peggy Guggenheim's The Art of This Century gallery on Manhattan.
 May 22 – The Equestrian statue of Christian V recast in bronze by Einar Utzon-Frank (1688 original by Abraham-César Lamoureux) is unveiled on Kongens Nytorv, Copenhagen.
 October 11 – National Gallery of Bosnia and Herzegovina established in Sarajevo.
 October 24 – In a double ceremony, Max Ernst (having been divorced from Peggy Guggenheim) marries Dorothea Tanning and Man Ray marries Juliet P. Browner in Beverly Hills, California.
 The Vienna School of Fantastic Realism is founded by Ernst Fuchs, Rudolf Hausner, and others.
 The Borough Group of artists is founded in London by Cliff Holden.
 Jean Dubuffet exhibits the series of works with paint mixed with sand and gravel, Hautes Pâtes, at the Galérie René Drouin.
 Jacob Lawrence begins painting his War Series.
 Sidney Nolan begins his first series of paintings of Ned Kelly.
 David Olère begins to produce artworks based on his experiences as Jewish Sonderkommando inmate 106144 of Auschwitz concentration camp during World War II.
 Musée de la Chartreuse, Molsheim, France, established (at this time under the name "Musée municipal")

Awards
 Archibald Prize: William Dargie – L C Robson, MC, MA

Works
 Harold Abbott – Triptych of Suffering
 George Ault – Bright Light at Russell's Corners
 Francis Bacon
 Painting (1946)
 Study for Man with Microphones (later abandoned and slashed by the artist)
 Charles Comfort – Dieppe Raid
 Dean Cornwell - The History of Transportation (lobby mural) at 10 Rockefeller Plaza in New York City (formerly the headquarters of Eastern Airlines)
 Salvador Dalí – The Temptation of St. Anthony
 Jean Dubuffet – Apartment Houses
 Jacob Epstein – Bust of Winston Churchill
 M. C. Escher – lithographs
 Magic Mirror
 Three Spheres II
 Sawlaram Haldankar – Glow of Hope
 Barbara Hepworth – sculptures
 Pelagos
 Tides
 Edward Hopper – Approaching a City
 Dame Laura Knight – The Dock, Nuremberg
 L. S. Lowry – Good Friday, Daisy Nook
 Henri Matisse – L'Asie
 Georgia O'Keeffe – Bare Tree Trunks With Snow
 Pablo Picasso – Woman-Flower
 Ad Reinhardt -  How to Look at Modern Art in America
 Norman Rockwell - "Boy in a Dining Car"
 William Scott – The Frying Pan
 Andrew Wyeth – Winter 1946
 Jack Butler Yeats
 Men of Destiny
 The Whistle of a Jacket

Exhibitions
 Contemporary British Art – Toledo Museum of Art, Ohio, the Albright-Knox Art Gallery, Buffalo, New York, and the City Art Museum, St Louis.

Births
 January 8 – Betty Beaumont, Canadian American site-specific artist, all media
 January 10 – Kalidas Karmakar, Bangladeshi artist
 January 18 – Kirk Varnedoe, American art historian, writer and curator (d. 2003)
 January 26 – Timothy Clifford, English art historian and curator
 February 2 – David Gopito, Zimbabwean sculptor
 February 9 – Peter Linde, Swedish sculptor
 April 11 – Chris Burden, American performance and installation artist and sculptor (d. 2015)
 April 27 – Nicholas Serota, English curator
 May 30 – Jan de Bie, painter and photographer (d. 2021)
 June 29 – Egon von Fürstenberg, Swiss fashion designer (d. 2004)
 July 6 – Jamie Wyeth, American realist painter
 July 11 – Chris Killip, Manx-born documentary photographer (d. 2020)
 July 25 – Nicole Farhi, French sculptor and fashion designer
 September 27 – T. C. Cannon, Native American painter (d. 1978)
 November 4 – Robert Mapplethorpe, American photographer (d. 1989)
 November 5 – Herman Brood, Dutch musician, painter and media personality (d. 2001)
 November 20 – Alice Aycock, American sculptor and installation artist
 December 2 – Gianni Versace, Italian fashion designer (k. 1997)
 December 8 – Jacques Bourboulon, French nude and fashion photographer
 December 12 – Don Gummer, American sculptor
 December 25 – Christopher Frayling, English cultural historian

Deaths
 January 2 – O'Galop (Marius Rossillon), French cartoonist (b. 1867)
 January 23 – Helene Schjerfbeck, Finnish painter (b. 1862)
 February 17
 Dorothy Gibson, American artist's model and silent film actress (b. 1889)
 Sir George Pirie, Scottish painter (b. 1863)
 July 11 – Paul Nash, English painter (b. 1889)
 July 13 – Alfred Stieglitz, American photographer (b. 1864)
 July 17 – Florence Fuller, Australian painter (b. 1867)
 October 7 - Christopher R. W. Nevinson, English war artist (b. 1889)
 October 28 – Manuel Ortiz de Zárate, Chilean painter (b. 1887)
 October 30 – Charles Despiau, French sculptor (b. 1874)
 November 23
 Arthur Dove, American abstract painter (b. 1880)
 Léon Spilliaert, Belgian symbolist painter and graphic artist (b. 1881)
 November 24 – László Moholy-Nagy, Hungarian painter and photographer (b. 1895)
 December 28 – Elie Nadelman, Polish-born American sculptor (b. 1882)
 December 29 – Arnold Friedman, American Modernist painter (b. 1874)

References 

 
Years of the 20th century in art
1940s in art